Aksyonov (masculine) or Aksyonova (feminine), also spelled Aksenov/Aksenova may refer to:
Aksyonov (surname) (fem. Aksyonova), Russian last name
Aksenov (rural locality) (or Aksyonova), several rural localities in Russia
4777 Aksenov, a main belt asteroid